Géronce is a commune in the Pyrénées-Atlantiques department in south-western France.

Geography

Access 
There are several routes leading in and out of Géronce. Route 936 linking Oloron-Sainte-Marie and Bayonne passes by the outside of the town. Route 836 passes through the middle of Géronce and links route 936 through roundabouts at Orin and at Geüs-d'Oloron. Highway 524 passes through the neighborhoods of Urein, Dous, Castéra, and Lacé, and links route 836 to route 24 via Esquiule and Barcus.

Water 
The Gave d'Oloron (a tributary of the Gave de Pau) flows through the commune, as well as its tributary Joos, and its tributaries, the streams of Josset and Cambillou.

See also
Communes of the Pyrénées-Atlantiques department

References

Communes of Pyrénées-Atlantiques